Town Line is the first EP by American Staind frontman Aaron Lewis, and is his first solo release. An extended play consisting of country songs, it was released on March 1, 2011, on Stroudavarious Records. As of the chart dated September 3, 2011, the album has sold 200,208 copies in the US.

Content
The first single, "Country Boy", which features George Jones, Charlie Daniels, and Chris Young, was released on December 7, 2010. This song has charted on both Hot Country Songs and Rock Songs. The track "Tangled Up in You" is a re-recording of a song from Staind's album The Illusion of Progress.

Live versions of the songs "Vicious Circles" and "Country Boy" also appear on the deluxe edition of Lewis' 2012 album, The Road.

Critical reception
Giving it three stars out of five, Jessica Phillips of Country Weekly thought that the songs were "rich with imagery." She also praised Lewis for "resist[ing] the temptation to don a faux twang", but criticized the single "Country Boy" as "an unfortunately overextended string of rural impressions." Sam Gazdziak of Engine 145 rated it two stars out of five, calling "Country Boy" "turgid" and "polarizing", also criticizing the three versions present on the EP.

Track listing

Personnel
Adapted from liner notes.

Eddie Bayers - drums
Alexa Carter - background vocals on "Tangled Up in You"
Charlie Daniels - guitar, fiddle, and recitation vocals on "Country Boy"
Paul Franklin - steel guitar
Tony Harrell - B-3 organ, piano
George Jones - guest vocals on "Country Boy"
Ben Kitterman - dobro
Aaron Lewis - acoustic guitar, lead vocals
Brent Mason - electric guitar
Larry Paxton - bass guitar
Scotty Sanders - steel guitar
Biff Watson - acoustic guitar
Chris Young - background vocals on "Country Boy"

Charts

Weekly charts

Year-end charts

Singles

References 

2011 debut EPs
Aaron Lewis albums
Albums produced by James Stroud
R&J Records albums